Calytrix variabilis is a species of plant in the myrtle family Myrtaceae that is endemic to Western Australia.

It usually blooms between July and December producing pink-purple star-shaped flowers.

Found on Swan Coastal Plain extending into the southern Wheatbelt and South West region of Western Australia where it grows on lateritic soils.
 
The species was first formally described by the botanist John Lindley in 1839 in the work A Sketch of the Vegetation of the Swan River Colony.

References

Plants described in 1839
variabilis
Flora of Western Australia